Clint's Crazy Bargains was established in November 1978, as a partnership between David and Kerry Rickards, and Norm and Sue O'Neill.

It was a retailer of discount variety merchandise including gifts, cosmetics, clothing, books, craft goods, hardware, stationery, toys, jewellery, kitchenware, caneware, haberdashery, manchester, small electrical goods, luggage and furniture.

History 
The Business was initially a single store (Bankstown, NSW, Australia) and a market stall operation dealing primarily in distressed and surplus merchandise bought from public auction.

As the business evolved through wholesaling and new shop openings, techniques and policies changed constantly, but the theme of the "Bargain Store" remained. A diverse range of goods perceived to be cheap.

Throughout the early and mid 1980s, the principal product source continued to be distressed or opportunity merchandise. As stock needs increased the weakness of such a dependence emerged, low cost manufactured goods from South East Asia became the target. Volandu Pty Ltd was formed in October 1985 as an import company with the same ownership as Clints.

Wholesaling was commenced to increase purchasing power and credibility overseas. The continuing growth of Clints and similar chains in other states brought about fanatic import volume increases. From 100 containers in 1987 to over 3000 in 1995. The original 23 000 square foot warehouse was replaced by a 50 000 square feet warehouse in 1990, only to be replaced by a 215 000 square feet warehouse complex purchased in January 1992. Also in 1992, a warehouse in China was completed for the consolidation of goods for Clints and other Volandu customers. This facility allowed flexibility and control over a massive range of cheap products being produced in Southern China.

An additional distribution warehouse of 100 000 square feet was purchased in February 1995 in Footscay, Victoria, Australia, to service the then growing  number of Victorian stores and to facilitate the movement of increasing volumes of merchandise between Sydney and Melbourne.

The business operated 116 stores across New South Wales, Victoria and the ACT, eventually acquired Fair Dinkum Bargains and Silly Sollys.

Acquisitions 
In 2000 the Clint's Crazy Bargains business was sold to the New Zealand company The Warehouse.

In 2008 the remaining stores were sold to Australian Discount Retail a group of Australian investors and subsequently renamed Sam's Warehouse.

References 

Retail companies established in 1978
Retail companies disestablished in 2000
Defunct retail companies of Australia
Discount stores of Australia
Companies based in Sydney
Australian companies disestablished in 2000
Australian companies established in 1978